Wat Benchamabophit Dusitvanaram is a Buddhist temple (wat) in the Dusit District of Bangkok, Thailand. Also known as the marble temple, it is one of Bangkok's best-known temples and a major tourist attraction. It typifies Bangkok's ornate style of high gables, stepped-out roofs and elaborate finials.

Construction
Construction of the temple began in 1899 at the request of King Chulalongkorn after building his palace nearby. The temple's name literally means 'the Temple of the fifth King located near Dusit Palace'. It was designed by Prince Naris, a half-brother of the king, and is built of Italian marble.  It has display of Carrara marble pillars, a marble courtyard and two large singhas (lions) guarding the entrance to the bot.  The interiors are decorated with crossbeams of lacquer and gold, and in shallow niches in the walls of paintings of important stupas all over the country.  The cloister around the assembly hall houses 52 images of Buddha.

The temple
Inside the ordination hall (ubosot) is a Sukhothai-style Buddha statue named Phra Buddhajinaraja, cast in 1920 after the original in Wat Mahathat in Phitsanulok. The main Buddha image is a copy of Phra Buddha Chinarat that resides in Phitsanulok in northern Thailand. The ashes of King Chulalongkorn are buried beneath the statue. In the gallery surrounding the ordination hall are 52 Buddha statues each showing different mudras (signs), collected by Prince Damrong Rajanubhab for his king. The temple was featured in the famous The Amazing Race 9 as the 10th and final elimination pit-stop. The image of the temple's façade is visible on the reverse side of the Five-Baht coin of the Thai currency. The site contains the Benchamabophit National Museum.

Worship and festivals
Merit makers come to the monks of the temple for getting alms every morning.  Between 06:00–07:30 in the morning, monks line up on Nakhon Pathom with their bowls to receive donations of curry, rice, lotus buds, incense, toiletries and other essentials.  The evening candlelight procession around the bot during the Buddhist festivals of Magha Puja (in February) and Visakha Puja (in May) are common at this temple.

Protection
In 2005, the temple was submitted to UNESCO for consideration as a future World Heritage Site.

Crime
This temple is sometimes used as part of a Gem scam in Bangkok. The scam involves tourists buying fake gem stones. This temple is part of the free tour offered to potential victims.

Gallery

Notes

References

External links

 The Marble Temple of Thailand

Benchamabophit
Museums in Bangkok
Religious museums in Thailand
Dusit district
Marble buildings
Thai Theravada Buddhist temples and monasteries
Registered ancient monuments in Bangkok